John Bingley (born 10 November 1941) is a former Australian rules footballer who played for St Kilda in the Victorian Football League.

Early life and career in Tasmania
Bingley began his senior football career with City-South in the NTFA and then moved to East Devonport in the NWFU.

St Kilda
Despite playing only 8 games in his career he was a member of the Saints premiership winning side in 1966, with the Grand Final being his last appearance.

Return to Tasmania
In 1967 Bingley returned to Tasmania taking on the role of captain-coach at Clarence. He led the club to the TFL premiership in 1970.
He also kicked the winning goal for the state team in the interstate match that year versus Western Australia.

John Bingley was inducted into the Tasmanian Football Hall of Fame in 2005

References

External links

1941 births
Living people
St Kilda Football Club players
St Kilda Football Club Premiership players
East Devonport Football Club players
Clarence Football Club coaches
Clarence Football Club players
Australian rules footballers from Tasmania
City-South Football Club players
Tasmanian Football Hall of Fame inductees
One-time VFL/AFL Premiership players